Raymond Phillips (1900 – 1970) was a Jamaican cricketer. He played in seven first-class matches for the Jamaican cricket team from 1925 to 1928, and was part of the West Indian team that toured England in 1923.

See also
 List of Jamaican representative cricketers

References

External links
 

1900 births
1970 deaths
Jamaican cricketers
Jamaica cricketers
Place of birth missing